Xenia Smits (born 22 April 1994) is a Belgian-born German handball player for SG BBM Bietigheim and the German national team.

Achievements
EHF European League:
Winner: 2022
Bundesliga:
Winner: 2022
LFH Division 1 Féminine:
Winner: 2016, 2017, 2018, 2019
Coupe de France:
Winner: 2017, 2019

Individual awards
French Championship Hope of the Season: 2016
Championnat de France Best Left Back: 2018
MVP of the EHF European League Final Four: 2022

References

External links

1994 births
Living people
German female handball players
People from Wilrijk
Expatriate handball players
German expatriate sportspeople in France